Eleutherius (died 136) was the bishop of Byzantium for approximately seven years (129–136 AD). He succeeded Bishop Diogenes. He was in office during the rule of Emperor Hadrian. His successor was Felix.

References 

2nd-century Romans
2nd-century Byzantine bishops
Bishops of Byzantium
136 deaths
Year of birth unknown